Harutaeographa fasciculata is a moth of the family Noctuidae. It is found in the Himalaya: Sikkim, northern India, Nepal and northern Vietnam (the Fansipan Mountains).

References

Moths described in 1894
Orthosiini